Zero price may refer to:

 Free of charge, a price of zero
 The offering price of a Zero-coupon bond or its financial equivalent